Krasnooktyabrsky is an urban locality (an urban-type settlement) in Medvedevsky District of the Mari El Republic, Russia. As of the 2010 Census, its population was 4,559.

Administrative and municipal status
Within the framework of administrative divisions, the urban-type settlement of Krasnooktyabrsky is incorporated within Medvedevsky District as Krasnooktyabrsky Urban-Type Settlement (an administrative division of the district). As a municipal division, Krasnooktyabrsky Urban-Type Settlement is incorporated within Medvedevsky Municipal District as Krasnooktyabrsky Urban Settlement.

References

Notes

Sources

Urban-type settlements in the Mari El Republic
